Saint Gwrddlew or Gwrtheli, Gartheli, was a pre-congregational saint of the 5th century medieval, Wales.

Life
Gwrddlew was born about 480 AD at Twrcelyn commote, Anglesey, Wales. He was the son of Caw of Strathclyde. His father had moved from southern Scotland with his family after being deposed in the turbulence caused by the Anglo-Saxon settlement of Britain.
He founded churches at Llanddewi Brefi, Cardiganshire, Anglesea and Caerleon

Legacy

Gwrtheli or Gartheli is entered as patron of Capel Gartheli in the Myvyrian Archaiology.
This was  formerly a chapelry within the parish of Llanddewi Brefi, Cardiganshire, but as of 1907 was a separate benefice.
Other chapels in Llanddewi Brefi were Blaenpennal chapel (Saint David), Capel Bettws Lleicu (Saint Lucia) and Capel Gwenfyl (Saint Gwenfyl).
Nicholas Roscarrock lists 7 January as the festival of Gwrthelu, who may be identified with Gwrddelw.

Sir John Rhys in his Celtic Folklore, page 537, writes of the chapelry in Llanddewi Vrevi, "The ascription of this church to a Saint called Gartheli is more than doubtful, as Gartheli is simply garth Eli, that is, Eli's enclosure. If, therefore, the name of the place involves that of a saint, it must be an otherwise unknown Eli. In the account of the hunting of the boar Twrch Trwyth, in the Welsh romance of Culhwch and Olwen, there is a huntsman of Arthur's called Eli, who pursues Grugyn, one of the Twrch's offspring, to Garth Grugyn in Ceredigion. Garth Grugyn is supposed to be near Llanilar. Possibly the original story located at Garth Eli the death of Eli, or some other incident in which Eli was concerned, just as Garth Grugyn is for some reason associated with Grugyn."

Etymology of his name 
The etymology of the name is Vehemently Brave.

Notes

Sources

 

Medieval Welsh saints
Medieval Scottish saints
Northern Brythonic saints
6th-century Welsh people
6th-century Christian saints
People from Anglesey